Broad is a surname. Notable people with the surname include:

 Alfred Scott Broad (1854–1929) South Australian artist
 C. D. Broad (1887–1971), English philosopher known for works such as Scientific Thought (1930) and Examination of McTaggart's Philosophy (1933)
 Chris Broad (cricketer) (born 1957), former English cricketer and match referee
 Chris Broad (filmmaker) (born 1990), British YouTuber, filmmaker and podcast host.
 Eli Broad (1933–2021), American billionaire and philanthropist
 Francis Alfred Broad (1874–1956), British politician; also known as Frank Broad
 James Broad (disambiguation), multiple people
 Lindsey Broad, American television, stage, and film actress
 Nick Broad (died 2013), English nutritionist
 Perry Broad (1921–1993), Brazilian SS officer at Auschwitz concentration camp
 Shane Broad (born 1976), Australian politician and rower
 Stephen Broad (born 1980), former English footballer
 Stuart Broad (born 1986), English cricketer, son of the cricketer, Chris Broad
 Billy Idol (born 1955), real name William Albert Michael Broad
 William Broad (born 1951), The New York Times writer